Conrad Hasenflug (February 27, 1863 – November 24, 1932) was an American politician from New York.

Life
He was born on February 27, 1863, in the Free City of Frankfurt, then a member state of the German Confederation. The next year, the family emigrated to the United States, and settled in Williamsburg, Brooklyn. He became a retail, and later wholesale, produce dealer.

Hasenflug was a member of the New York State Assembly (Kings Co., 19th D.) in 1900 and 1901. In November 1901, he ran for Clerk of Kings County, but was defeated. Afterwards he was appointed as Deputy Dock Commissioner of New York City.

He was a member of the New York State Senate (9th D.) from 1905 to 1908, sitting in the 128th, 129th, 130th and 131st New York State Legislatures. In 1909, he removed to Queens where he ran saloons and amusement establishments.

He died on Thanksgiving Day, November 24, 1932, at his home at 84–37 169th Street in Jamaica, Queens, of pneumonia; and was buried at the Lutheran Cemetery in Glendale, Queens.

Sources

1863 births
1932 deaths
Democratic Party New York (state) state senators
Politicians from Brooklyn
Democratic Party members of the New York State Assembly
Deaths from pneumonia in New York City
German emigrants to the United States
People from Queens, New York